Dositej II (7 December 1906 – 20 May 1981) was the Metropolitan of Skopje, under the canonical jurisdiction of the Serbian Orthodox Church from 1959 to 1967, and Archbishop of Ohrid and Macedonia as the primate of the self-proclaimed Macedonian Orthodox Church until his death in 1981.

Biography
He was born as Dimitrije Stojković (Serbian Cyrillic: Димитрије Стојковић) on 7 December 1906 in Smederevo, Kingdom of Serbia, to father Lazar and mother Sofija. His family were Serbian  Patriarshists from Mavrovo, Ottoman Macedonia. He finished primary school and gymnasium in Belgrade. Dositej entered the theological school in Sremski Karlovci in 1922. He took monastic vows in the Kičevo Monastery in 1924. Between 1924 and 1932 he was a fellowman of Hilandar and then Gračanica. He finished theological school in Bitola in 1937. He graduated from the Theological Faculty in Belgrade in 1942. In 1947 he was appointed administrator of the Patriarchal Court in Sremski Karlovci, and in 1948 he was appointed archimandrite.

The Assembly of the Serbian Orthodox Church appointed archimandrite Dositej as vicar bishop of Toplica in 1951, as an aide bishop to the Serbian Patriarch. He was included in negotiations to resolve contentious church issues in Macedonia. At the end of 1951, the "Initiative Board" in Skopje demanded from Patriarch Vikentije II that Metropolitan of Skopje Josif Cvijović be replaced by bishop Dositej. Although the demand was not met, it was followed by several in the coming years, with growing support from the regime. On 4 October 1958, Dositej was uncanonically proclaimed the "Archbishop of Ohrid, and Skopje, and Metropolitan of Macedonia" in an assembly in Ohrid. He then left his regular duties in Belgrade and put himself as the head of this schismatic group, which banned the canonical archiereus Josif Cvijović to return to his eparchy.

Following the Communist regime's pressure, the Assembly of the Serbian Orthodox Church, after its 3–19 June 1959 session, recognized Dositej as the Metropolitan of Skopje. Despite the canonical order, Dositej and two other bishops established the "Synod of the Autonomous Orthodox Church in SR Macedonia". In order to preserve peace, the Serbian Orthodox Assembly formalized Dositej's decisions, as he had committed to that certain irregularities in the constitution of the Macedonian Church be removed. However, in the following years it was shown that gaining autonomy was only an intermediate step towards requesting autocephaly. 

In an assembly in Ohrid in 1967, the autocephaly of the Macedonian Orthodox Church was proclaimed, leading to an open schism since the move was not recognized by the Serbian Orthodox Church nor any other autocephalous church. Dositej and the other bishops of the schismatic Macedonian Orthodox Church were indicted in the Serbian Orthodox Church court. In the coming years there were repeated negotiations on settlement, but without results.

He died on 20 May 1981, in Skopje, SR Macedonia (now in North Macedonia).

See also
 Metropolitanate of Skopje

Notes

References

Sources
 
 
 

Archbishops of Ohrid and Macedonia
20th-century Eastern Orthodox archbishops
Eastern Orthodox Christians from Serbia
Serbian Orthodox metropolitans of Skopje
1906 births
1981 deaths
20th-century Serbian people
People from Smederevo
Schisms in Christianity